Michigan City is a city in LaPorte County, Indiana, United States. It is one of the two principal cities of the Michigan City-La Porte, Indiana Metropolitan statistical area, which is included in the Chicago-Naperville-Michigan City Combined statistical area. It had a population of 31,479 at the 2010 census.

Michigan City is noted for both its proximity to Indiana Dunes National Park and for bordering Lake Michigan. It receives a fair amount of tourism during the summer, especially by residents of Chicago and nearby cities in Northern Indiana. The lighthouse is a notable symbol of the city and is incorporated in the heading of its sole newspaper, The News Dispatch, and its official seal.

History
Michigan City's origins date to 1830, when the land for the city was first purchased by Isaac C. Elston, a real estate speculator who had made his fortune in Crawfordsville, Indiana. The now-closed Elston Middle School, formerly Elston High School, was named after the founder.

The city was incorporated in 1836, by which point it had 1,500 residents, along with a post office, a newspaper, a church, a commercial district and ten hotels. That same year, the State Bank of Indiana opened a branch in town.

Michigan City was the 2nd city in Indiana to decriminalize marijuana, with marijuana laws more liberal than those of Marion County, the first city or county to decriminalize marijuana, allowing medical marijuana to be prescribed as early as 2016. Delta 9 is officially decriminalized in Michigan City.

Michigan City hosted the sailing competitions of the 1987 Pan American Games on Lake Michigan.

Geography

Michigan City is home to Trail Creek, which flows into Lake Michigan.

Climate 

The city has a usual weather pattern for a temperate region, with thunderstorms in the summer and snow during winter. Summers are often warm and humid. Due to its location next to Lake Michigan the city frequently experiences lake-effect snows and rain showers.

Demographics

2010 census
As of the census of 2010, there were 31,479 people, 12,136 households, and 7,147 families living in the city. The racial makeup of the city was 64.9% White, 28.1% African American, 0.4% Native American, 0.7% Asian, 2.1% from other races, and 3.7% from two or more races. Hispanic or Latino of any race were 5.9% of the population.

There were 12,136 households, of which 30.5% had children under the age of 18 living with them, 33.4% were married couples living together, 19.0% had a female householder with no husband present, 6.5% had a male householder with no wife present, and 41.1% were non-families. 34.3% of all households were made up of individuals, and 12% had someone living alone who was 65 years of age or older. The average household size was 2.37 and the average family size was 3.05.

The median age in the city was 37.1 years. 23.5% of residents were under the age of 18; 8.9% were between the ages of 18 and 24; 27.8% were from 25 to 44; 26.2% were from 45 to 64; and 13.5% were 65 years of age or older. The gender makeup of the city was 51.4% male and 48.6% female.

2000 census
As of the census of 2000, there were 32,900 people, 12,550 households, and 7,906 families living in the city. The racial makeup of the city was 69.45% White, 26.31% African American, 0.26% Native American, 0.51% Asian, 0.02% Pacific Islander, 1.10% from other races, and 2.36% from two or more races. Hispanic or Latino of any race were 3.15% of the population.

There were 12,550 households, out of which 30.6% had children under the age of 18 living with them, 40.0% were married couples living together, 18.1% had a female householder with no husband present, and 37.0% were non-families. 30.9% of all households were made up of individuals, and 11.6% had someone living alone who was 65 years of age or older. The average household size was 2.41 and the average family size was 3.02.

In the city, the population was spread out, with 25.0% under the age of 18, 9.6% from 18 to 24, 30.8% from 25 to 44, 20.6% from 45 to 64, and 14.1% who were 65 years of age or older. The median age was 35 years. For every 100 females, there were 101.8 males. For every 100 females age 18 and over, there were 100.9 males.

The median income for a household in the city was $33,732, and the median income for a family was $39,520. Males had a median income of $32,194 versus $23,125 for females. The per capita income for the city was $16,995. About 10.4% of families and 13.3% of the population were below the poverty line, including 20.2% of those under age 18 and 9.5% of those age 65 or over.

Arts and culture

Points of interest

Michigan City is the home of the Old Michigan City Light; and the newer currently functioning one which is Indiana's only lighthouse.

The Pullman-Standard rail car plant was located in Michigan City.

Lighthouse Place Premium Outlets mall, opened in 1987 on the city's North end, is an outdoor mall. Marquette Mall, constructed in 1965, was Michigan City's sole indoor shopping mall.

Franciscan Health Michigan City is Michigan City's main hospital, located just off of the 94 highway.

Michigan City also houses a zoo, and art center, and also is the home of the Indiana State Prison.

Michigan City also has one of the nation's oldest active municipal bands. Free concerts are performed for the public every Thursday evening at the Guy F. Foreman Amphitheatre located in Washington Park.

The eastern edge of Indiana Dunes National Park is also located in Michigan City. Features include Mount Baldy, a large wandering dune. A larger dune, Hoosier Slide, sat at the site of the current electrical generating station. This dune was mined for its sand in the late 19th century. The sand found on the beaches in and near Michigan City is nicknamed "singing sand" because of the sound it produces.

Michigan City Power Plant lies along the shore of Lake Michigan west of the downtown core. The cooling tower of the coal burning plant is visible for miles around and is often mistaken for a nuclear power plant.

Michigan City is home to the largest riverboat casino in Indiana, the Blue Chip Casino. In 2009, the Blue Chip complex added a 22-story hotel, which is the biggest building in northwest Indiana. Michigan City has also added a new skatepark at Pullman Field to its tourism offerings.

In the 2000s and 2010s, Michigan City has been working on revitalizing much of its north end, which contains the oldest portions of the city. One plan that has been discussed is the Andrews Plan, which won the 2008 CNU Charter Award of Excellence. Most of the discussion centers on maintaining and expanding open and accessible park areas on Lake Michigan and along Trail Creek.

The Barker House, John H. Barker Mansion, Elston Grove Historic District, First Congregational Church of Michigan City, Franklin Street Commercial Historic District, Garrettson-Baine-Bartholomew House, Haskell and Barker Historic District, Michigan City East Pierhead Light Tower and Elevated Walk, Michigan City Light, Michigan City Post Office, SS Muskegan Shipwreck Site, and Washington Park are listed in the National Register of Historic Places.

Government

The mayor is Duane Parry. Michigan City has a Council with nine members. Six are elected from geographic wards and three are elected as at-large members.

City Council members are (as of March 2020):
 Bryant Dabney, First Ward
 Paul Przybylinski, Second Ward
 Michael Mack, Third Ward
 Sean Fitzpatrick, Fourth Ward, Council President
 Tracie Tillman, Fifth Ward
 Gene Simmons, Sixth Ward
 Dalia Zygas, Councilwoman-at-Large
 Angie Nelson-Deuitch, Councilwoman-at-Large
 Donald Przybylinski, Councilman-at-Large, Council Vice President

Education
Michigan City Area Schools, the city's public school system, includes one high school (Michigan City High School), two middle schools, and eight elementary schools. Michigan City previously also had three parochial high schools – Marquette, La Lumiere, and Duneland Lutheran but, due to a lack of funds, Duneland Lutheran closed down at the end of the 2008/2009 school year. There are several parochial elementary schools in the city, including St. Paul Lutheran School, St. Stanislaus Kostka School, Queen Of All Saints School, and Notre Dame Catholic School.

At one time Michigan City had two public high schools: M.C. Elston High School (Red Devils) (Elston was the name of one of the middle schools located in the city and was located at the former Elston High School), and M.C. Rogers High School (Raiders). The two schools combined after the 1994–1995 school year – the first graduating class was the Class of 1996 – and now constitute the present day Michigan City High School (Wolves). The school is located at the former Rogers High School site. Elston Middle School, along with elementary school Niemann, closed at the end of the 2013/2014 school year.

Michigan City has a lending library, the Michigan City Public Library. In addition, the La Porte County Public Library operates the Coolspring branch library just outside Michigan City city limits.

Media

Newspaper
The La Porte County Herald-Dispatch is Michigan City's only subscription newspaper, covering the city and the surrounding municipalities in LaPorte and Porter counties. The Beacher is a Michigan City-based weekly newspaper that covers Beverly Shores, Michigan City, Long Beach, LaPorte, Michiana and New Buffalo.

Chicago Tribune, Chicago Sun-Times and South Bend Tribune are distributed throughout Michigan City. Off the Water, a free weekly art and entertainment newspaper published by Niles, Michigan-based Leader Publications, primarily focuses on Niles-Benton Harbor Metropolitan Statistical Area, but it is distributed in downtown Michigan City.

Broadcast
Michigan City is in Chicago's Area of Dominant Influence. Radio and television broadcasts from both Chicago and South Bend reach most of the population.

Radio
Michigan City also has one FM radio station, WEFM FM 95.9 and one AM radio station, WIMS AM 1420. (Which is also heard on FM translator W236BD 95.1 FM).

Television
The city has one Government-access television (GATV) station, Access LaPorte County, as well as one channel operated by the local school system (MCAS).

Infrastructure

Transportation

Rail

Michigan City is a major stop along the South Shore Line, one of the last interurban rail lines in the U.S. The train runs directly through on 11th Street (it has no separate right-of-way, and shares the street with automobiles and other road traffic), making two stops in Michigan City's downtown area (11th Street and Carroll Avenue). A third stop, at Willard Avenue and 10th Street, closed in 1994. This rail line connects Michigan City with downtown Chicago westward as well as the South Bend Regional Airport to the east.

Prior to April 4, 2022, Amtrak served the city with Wolverine trains, which ran from Chicago to Detroit, and Pontiac three times a day in each direction, filling in several gaps in South Shore Line's weekday service and augmenting weekend service. While Wolverine trains were faster than South Shore Line trains, the South Shore Line was cheaper and ran more frequently. Currently, Amtrak trains pass through Michigan City without stopping and the nearest Amtrak station is New Buffalo, Michigan, about ten miles away.

Bus
Michigan City operates a bus service. Officially known as Michigan City Transit, it is made up of four routes that run on Monday-Saturday. All routes originate at Michigan City Public Library and travel around the city in (largely mono-directional) loops until they return to the library. Route 3 connects to Carroll Avenue South Shore Line station, while other routes connect to the 11th street station. In addition, Route 1 passes near the Amtrak station on the way to Washington Park. Michigan City also operates a Dial-a-Bus service.

Coach USA's Indiana Airport SuperSaver service between The University of Notre Dame and O'Hare airport stopped at Michigan City at the La Porte County Convention and Visitors Bureau at Marquette Mall (4073 S. Franklin St). The service made stops at Notre Dame, South Bend, Portage, Highland, Crestwood and O'Hare and Midway airports. Buses ran from 4:10 am – 1:10 am (US Central Time). Buses ran once every hour in both direction between Michigan City and O'Hare and Midway and once every two hours between Michigan City and Notre Dame. On December 10, 2019 Coach USA announced it will cease operations of its Indiana Airport SuperSaver service effective January 1, 2020.

Air
Michigan City Municipal Airport has a 4,100 foot asphalt runway and averages 118 operations per week.

Options for commercial air service include the South Bend International Airport in South Bend. The South Shore Line terminates at the South Bend airport, while there is a train stop serving the Gary airport.

Notable people
 Jean Baptiste Point du Sable is regarded as the first permanent resident of Chicago, Illinois. In 1779, he was living on the site of present-day Michigan City, Indiana, when he was arrested by the British military on suspicion of being an American sympathizer in the American Revolutionary War.
 Daniel D. Bruce, United States Marine who was posthumously awarded the Medal of Honor for heroism in Vietnam in March 1969
 Howard G. "Ward" Cunningham, author, software developer and inventor of the word and concept of the "wiki"
 Marilla Waite Freeman was the first Librarian of the Michigan City Public Library upon its opening in 1897.
 Allan Spear, eminent U.S. historian and political progressive, author, Black Chicago: The Making of a Negro Ghetto; president Minnesota State Senate, early advocate for gay people

Actors
 Charles Arnt, actor
 Anne Baxter, Academy Award-winning actress
 Rati Gupta, dancer and actress known for her recurring role as Anu, the fiancée of Raj Koothrappali in the CBS sitcom The Big Bang Theory.

Journalist/Writers
 Alvera Mickelsen, writer, journalism professor, advocate of Christian feminism, and co-founder of Christians for Biblical Equality (CBE)
 Achy Obejas, writer and journalist
 Amy Spindler, fashion critic and style editor of The New York Times Magazine
 Ted Thorne, Chicago news anchor, local radio host

Politicians
 Naomi Anderson, a black suffragist
 Pat Boy, member of the Indiana House of Representatives
 Richard G. Hatcher, mayor of Gary, Indiana
 John Huppenthal, Republican State senator in the Arizona State Legislature
 David E. Lilienthal, Chairman of the Tennessee Valley Authority 1941–1946; Chairman, U.S. Atomic Energy Commission, 1947–1949
 Zeola Hershey Misener, suffragist and one of the first women elected to the Indiana General Assembly
 Scott Pelath, former Indiana House of Representatives member
 John L. Sieb, member of the Wisconsin State Assembly, barber

Sports
 Abe Gibron, Chicago Bears football player and head coach
 Anita King, racecar driver, actress, and thoroughbred racehorse owner
 Mike LaRocco, professional Supercross and Motocross racer
 Don Larsen, Major League Baseball pitcher
 John Parry, former National Football League official
 Donnie Thomas, former linebacker for the New England Patriots

Artists
 Charles Freeman Lee, jazz trumpeter in the 1950s and 1960s, taught Science at Krueger School in Michigan City after retiring from music

See also

References

External links

 City of Michigan City, Indiana website

 
Cities in LaPorte County, Indiana
Northwest Indiana
Cities in Indiana
Indiana populated places on Lake Michigan
1830 establishments in Indiana
populated places established in 1830